Keali'i Lopez is an activist and lobbyist who served as the chairperson of the Democratic Party of Hawaii from May 2018 until her resignation in August 2019. She was appointed director of Hawaii State Department of Commerce and Consumer Affairs on December 4, 2010, and her term ended on December 1, 2014. Prior to that, she was an executive at a Hawaii nonprofit that ran several public-access television channels. She received a bachelor's degree in communications at University of Hawaii at Manoa.

On August 6, 2019, Lopez announced that she had accepted a nonpartisan position at the state offices of the AARP, forcing her to resign her position as Democratic Party chairperson mid-way through her two-year term.

References

Living people
People from Hawaii
University of Hawaiʻi at Mānoa alumni
Year of birth missing (living people)